Montbrun-les-Bains is a commune in the Drôme department in southeastern France.

The commune is well known for its spa treatments for managing respiratory disease and other medical disorders. The village is also very popular with cyclists, with cycle routes leading to the popular Mont Ventoux.

Population

See also
Communes of the Drôme department

References

Communes of Drôme
Plus Beaux Villages de France